Clarence Harley Bertram Curyer (11 December 1912 – 29 June 2003) was an Australian rules footballer who played with Norwood in the South Australian National Football League (SANFL) and St Kilda in the Victorian Football League (VFL).

Curyer, who was originally from Jamestown, was playing for Norwood when he was chosen to represent South Australia at the 1933 Sydney Carnival. In 1935 he joined St Kilda and played 104 games for the club, before transferring to Preston during the 1941 season. He played his football mostly in the back pocket and on the ball. Off the field, he worked in the fire brigade.

References

1912 births
Australian rules footballers from South Australia
St Kilda Football Club players
Norwood Football Club players
Preston Football Club (VFA) players
People from Jamestown, South Australia
2003 deaths